The Novardok Yeshiva was one of the biggest and most important yeshivas in pre-World War II Europe, and a powerful force within the Mussar movement. It was the first of hundreds of a network of Musar yeshivas, which were created subsequently. They all assumed the name of Novardok yeshivas.

The yeshiva was established in Novogrudok, Minsk Governorate, Russian Empire in 1896, together with a Kollel for married men, under the direction of Rabbi Yosef Yozel Horwitz, an alumnus of the Kovno Kollel and pupil of Rabbi Yisrael Salanter. In the footsteps of his mentor, he was a staunch advocate of the Mussar approach. He was known as the Alter fun Novardok, a Yiddish term meaning "the elder of Novardok".

The directors of the yeshivas were in constant contact with The Alter, who guided and visited them, spending nearly every Shabbos in a different town.

Novardok established yeshivas all over the region, in major cities such as Kyiv, Kharkiv, Nizhny Novgorod, Rostov-on-Don, Zhytomyr, Berdychiv, Tsaritsyn (now Volgograd), Saratov, Plogid, and Chernihiv. Influenced by the Alter, his students also created Yeshivas in Kherson, Mohyliv-Podilskyi, Kamieniec-Podolski, Berdichev, Nikolaev, Bălţi, Odessa, Piotrków Trybunalski and other places. The Alter sent young scholars to lead the yeshivas.

One of the highlights of the yeshiva's mussar program was its daily "mussar hour." During these sessions, students engaged in fiery soul-searching.

Early history

The yeshiva opened with ten students. A few months later there were already fifty. A year after the yeshiva's establishment, great criticism was levelled at the study and practice of Mussar, and the opponents of that philosophy sought to close the yeshiva. They didn't succeed. By 1899, the yeshiva had swelled to 200 pupils.

Some students came to Novardok yeshiva from as far as the Caucasus.

At first, The Alter served as both the rosh yeshiva and mashgiach of the yeshiva, delivering shiurim in Gemara and mussar. In time, though, he appointed others to deliver the Gemara shiurim, while he focused on developing the mussar aspect of the yeshiva.

Gomel 
During the outbreak of World War I, the Yeshiva moved en-masse to Gomel. Aside from functioning as a yeshiva, it also served as a safe house for young bochurim, seeking refuge from the war.

The Yeshiva would have conscripts demanded from it, but the students would refuse to come. There were stories in the yeshiva about the soldiers threatening students at gunpoint, only to have the student respond that the soldier was powerless before God.

Escape to Poland; Kiev era 

After the Bolshevik takeover of Russia, the Alter ordered his students to cross the border into Poland. this was a top secret operation that not even the parents knew about. Many of the students were shot in the attempt; others were sent to Siberian prison camps, but six hundred made it across the border.

In 1919, when the Yeshiva was fleeing the war and was stationed in Kiev, a typhus outbreak occurred in the Yeshiva. The Alter succumbed to it.

Interwar period 
The Alter's son-in-law, Rabbi Avraham Yoffen, was the head of the Novardok yeshiva in Białystok, the biggest Yeshiva in Poland between the two world wars. This yeshiva Beis Yosef, which was the name of all Novardok yeshivas in Poland, supervised 30 other Beis Yosef yeshivas.

The Novardok philosophy

Self-improvement
Novardok had its own unique outlook, stressing the total negation of ego and the physical world. Through this, the complete and total focus of a person can be on his spiritual and intellectual side. Like other Mussar schools, Novardok demanded the complete shattering of personal desires, eradicating any vestige of evil habits. For that purpose, students would carry notebooks, in which they would daily enter records of failures and achievements. Before bedtime, they would check their "bookkeeping" and make plans-of-action for correcting faults. One method of "breaking" oneself was by denying oneself extra pleasures of this world.

Students of Novardok participated in deliberately humiliating behaviour, such as wearing old, patched clothing, or going to a shop and asking for a product not sold there, such as screws in a bakery. All Novardok students would share their personal belongings with friends to rid themselves of their desires for worldly possessions.

One pupil related that the purpose of these exercises were not to "put yourself down", as is commonly thought. The training, in fact, promoted the opposite; it gave the students the emotional freedom from the chains of public approval. They discovered that the fear of embarrassment was actually much greater than the reality. This strengthened their confidence to do the right thing, oblivious to what others might think.

Novardok network
An extension of Novardok's unconventional approach entailed the establishment of numerous branches of the yeshiva. The most elite students of the yeshiva would set out on foot to strange communities without money in their pockets, simultaneously abstaining from speech and not asking for a ride or even food. Upon reaching a town, they would enter the Beth Midrash, and without a word to anyone, study Torah.

With this method, Novardok established in Poland alone no less than seventy yeshivas of varying sizes. Dispatched from the yeshiva base in Białystok, teams would investigate towns and cities and evaluate their suitability for a yeshiva. The extensive Novardok network supplied half of all the students to Eastern Europe's other famous yeshivas.

In Israel
One of the Alter's students, Rabbi Ben Tzion Bruk opened a branch of the Yeshiva in Jerusalem in the 1930s. The Yeshiva was called Bais Yoseph Novardok. Today, it is headed by his son and grandson, Rabbi Yitzchok Bruk and Rabbi Avrohom Bruk, respectively.

Post World War II
With the exception of Gateshead Talmudical College which is officially called "Yeshivas Beis Yosef" of Gateshead, all Novardok yeshivas in Europe were wiped out during the Holocaust. Several Novardok yeshivas were established after the Holocaust. However, most of the post-World War II yeshivas are run as regular yeshivas, without the unique Novardok way of education.

Rabbi Avraham Yoffen survived the Holocaust, came to the United States, and settled in Brooklyn, New York where he re-established the yeshiva. The faculty consisted of Rabbi Yoffen as dean, his son, Rabbi Yaakov Yoffen as a lecturer, and his son-in-law Rabbi Yehuda Leib Nekritz as Mashgiach ruchani.

During the 1960s, Rabbi Avraham Yoffen moved to Jerusalem and established a branch of his yeshiva in Meah Shearim. Under the leadership of the younger Rabbi Yoffen and Rabbi Nekritz, the Brooklyn branch continued to thrive and became renowned as a center for advanced Talmudic studies.

Following Rabbi Avraham Yoffen's passing in 1970, leadership of the Jerusalem branch was assumed by his grandson, Rabbi Aaron Yoffen, editor of the Mossad Harav Kook edition of the Ritva's commentary to Yevamot and Nedarim. Yearly, Rabbi Yaakov Jofen would travel to Jerusalem to teach the students of his father's yeshiva.

Following Rabbi Nekritz's death and Rabbi Yaakov Yoffen's passing in 2003, the leadership of the Brooklyn-based yeshiva fell to their sons, Rabbi Mordechai Yoffen and Rabbi Tzvi Nekritz. They chose to move the Yeshiva to the Flatbush neighborhood of Brooklyn, and bring in Rabbi Yaakov Drillman of Yeshiva Chaim Berlin as a Rosh Yeshiva.

The Jerusalem branch is headed by Rabbi Shmuel and Rabbi Eitan Yoffen, sons of Rabbi Aaron Yoffen. However, the latter is primarily a high level talmudic professor in the Chevron Yeshiva (Knesset Yisrael) of Jerusalem .

Another branch of the yeshiva, the Yeshiva of Far Rockaway in Far Rockaway, New York, is led by Rabbi Yechiel Perr, son-in-law of Rabbi Yehuda Leib Nekritz. The yeshiva is named after Rabbi Yoffen's book, Derech Ayson.

Another branch in the footsteps of Novardok is Yeshiva Madreigas HaAdam in Queens, NY, named after the Alter's mussar compendium, headed by Rabbi Yoffen's grandson, Rabbi Moshe Faskowitz.

A significant, additional network of Novardok Yeshivas was founded after World War II in France by Rabbi Gershon Liebman, which in its heyday, had 40 schools and 6,000 students. Though "Rabenou Guerchon" as he is known in France had founded numerous yeshivos before the war, and had even managed to keep one going during the war, the Beth Yosef-France network found its origins within the newly liberated camp of Bergen-Belsen. Relocating to various DP camps, and then through several French cities, the yeshiva became a mainstay of the French Jewish community until today.

Reb Gershon would travel to Morocco to recruit Jewish students, whose only other option for Jewish education were the irreligious Alliance Israélite schools.

Notable alumni
Europe
Dayan Yehezkel Abramsky
Rabbi Meir Bar-Ilan
Chaim Grade
Rabbi Yosef Shlomo Kahaneman
Rabbi Yaakov Yisrael Kanievsky
Rabbi Gershon Liebman
Rabbi Yaakov Galinsky
Rabbi Yehuda Leib Nekritz
Rabbi Yitzchak Orlansky

New York
Rabbi Dr. Irving Greenberg
Rabbi Nachman Kahane
Rabbi Yechiel Perr
Rabbi Yera'hmiel Eliyahu Botschko
Rabbi Yehuda Mandel

Further reading
A condensed version of the history of the Novardok Yeshiva can be found in a collective book, written by Rabbi Yehuda Leib Nekritz.

A biography about the Alter of Navordok was written by Rabbi Shlomo Weintraub and published by Artscroll in February 2020.

References

 
Musar movement
Yeshivas of Belarus
Jewish Belarusian history
Orthodox Judaism in Belarus
Jews and Judaism in the Russian Empire
Orthodox yeshivas in Europe
Yeshivas of Lithuania
Orthodox yeshivas in New York City
Educational institutions established in 1896
Pre-World War II European yeshivas
Yeshivas of Poland
1896 establishments in the Russian Empire